The Parti nul (French for Null Party) is a political party in the Canadian province of Quebec. The party bills itself as a protest party, a way for citizens to show their displeasure at the existing political structure in the province. It was founded after the 2008 provincial election on 9 April 2009.

Its name is a play on words; the similar-sounding phrase partie nulle means draw (in the sense of the result of a game at the conclusion of which none of the players win) in French.

Leadership 
 Renaud Blais (2009–present)

Election results

References 

Provincial political parties in Quebec
Organizations based in Quebec City
Political parties established in 2009
2009 establishments in Quebec